Enda Bonner (born October 1949) is an Irish Fianna Fáil politician and sportsperson. He was a councillor for the Glenties electoral area of Donegal County Council from 1999 to 2019. He was also a Senator from 1997 to 2002. He attempted to win election to Dáil Éireann in 2002.

He also played for the Donegal county football team. Bonner is a senior partner in an auditors and accountants firm based in Letterkenny.

In March 2021, he gave an interview to the Donegal News in which he commented on Fianna Fáil and the party's members of the Oireachtas. He described Barry Cowen and Dara Calleary as "good people" who party leader Micheál Martin had "got rid of" and Niall Collins as "another good man". However, he said Charlie McConalogue and Niall Blaney's favouring of a coalition with Fine Gael was due to self interest. He criticised the appointment of Stephen Donnelly as Minister for Health but also criticised the timing of opposition from within Fianna Fáil to Micheál Martin continuing as Taoiseach.

Bonner is a cousin of former international goalkeeper, Packie Bonner. He is chairman of his local GAA club.

References

External links
 Fianna Fáil's official website

1949 births
Living people
Donegal inter-county Gaelic footballers
Fianna Fáil senators
Gaelic games club administrators
Irish accountants
Irish sportsperson-politicians
Local councillors in County Donegal
Members of the 21st Seanad
People from Glenties
Nominated members of Seanad Éireann